Kaanchi: The Unbreakable is a 2014 Indian Hindi-language romance film produced and directed by Subhash Ghai, starring newcomer actress Mishti and Kartik Aaryan supported by veteran actors Rishi Kapoor and Mithun Chakraborty.

Plot

Kaanchi is a story of the inner power of a woman who represents over one million suppressed youth against injustice in her country. Kaanchi ‘Sigdi’ (Mishti) is a strong girl who lives with her mother and sister in a village Koshampa. She is in love with her childhood friend Binda (Kartik Aaryan), and their families decide to get them married. Meanwhile, the Kakda family try to occupy Koshampa and turn it into an industrial hub. Binda fights for it. Sushant (Rishabh Sinha), the son of Shyam Kakda (Mithun Chakraborty), falls in love with Kaanchi and wants to marry her. But Kaanchi rejects him. Because of this, Sushant kills Binda before their wedding in front of Kaanchi. A furious Kaanchi leaves for Mumbai seeking revenge on the Kakda family. She lives in the house of Bagulla (Chandan Roy Sanyal), her old friend. She finds a servant job at Shyam Kakda's house by making some contacts. She tries to expose his affair with his secretary as well as the truth behind Binda's murder, by recording a video in his bedroom. But she gets caught by the guard but safely escapes while she loses her phone. After few days she finds out that Sushant is returning to India and is going to stay with Jumar Kakda (Rishi Kapoor). She joins as a servant at his house with Bagulla's help. She manages to steal the chip which has all the secret information of their business. Meanwhile, she gets her phone back from her friend who works at Shyam Kakda's house. She submits the evidence to a news channel and cripples the business of the Kakda family and also saves her village Koshampu. But Bagulla, who is a secret agent helping the Kakda family, sells her to Sushant, who then captures Kaanchi's sister. Later, Bagulla changes his mind and comes back to help Kaanchi. Finally, Kaanchi kills Sushant.

Then she returns to her village and rejoins her family. It is also the story of an innocent rural beauty and her fight against power.

Cast

 Mishti as Kaanchi
 Kartik Aaryan as Binda Singh
 Natasha Rastogi as Teji (Kaanchi's mother)
 Anil Charanjeett as Subedar (Binda's Father)
 Mithun Chakraborty as Shyam Kakda
 Rishi Kapoor as Jumar B. Kakda
 Rishabh Sinha as Sushant Kakda (Shyam Kakda's son)
 Pallavi Subhash Chandran as Savita Pathare (Shyam's Keep)
 Amrita Raichand as Gayatri (Jumar's Wife)
 Chandan Roy Sanyal as Inspector Ratanlal Bagulla
 Sahil Vaid as Sanjay Pathare
 Meeta Vashisht as Meeta
 Adil Hussain as CBI officer Arun Roy
Narayan Ram as Chholiya Team
 Akash Dhar as Satykaam
 Gargi Patel as Maya Tai
 Naresh Gosain as Inspector Bhaagwat
 Mukesh Bhatt as Pannalal
 Anant Jog as Vedant
 Gulshan Pandey as Inspector Radhekant
 Nissar Khan as Bhavesh (JB Kakda's Man)
 Ankit Varshneya as Saadiq (Satykam's Man)
 Mahima Chaudhry special appearance in item number
 Hazel Crowney special appearance in song "Thumka"
 Shakti Mohan item song "Kambal ke Neeche"
 Mukti Mohan item song "Kambal Ke Neeche"

Development
Kartik Aaryan was roped in to perform the role. The music director Ismail Darbaar's son, Zaid Darbar assisted Subhash Ghai in the direction. The trailer was released on 6 March 2014 on YouTube, which received positive reviews.

Besides deploying their own marketing team, Mukta Arts partnered with web channel Trendspotters.tv for web and social-media promotion. Commenting on the film, Subash Ghai said, "Kaanchi to me is a project that is larger than life itself, the film, though commercial, is an inspirational story for the young women of today.

Shooting
Filming occurred in locations around Mumbai and Nainital. 
 
Late last year when asked about its delay, director Subhash Ghai said he was in no hurry to release the film. He said "A few portions of the film are left for shoot. I am going to take my own time to release Kaanchi. I am not in a hurry to release the film as I don't want to repeat the mistake I did with my last film" and added that "Most of the films which do not do well because of the pressure of its release date. Directors later feel that the film would have worked better if they had given some more time."

Kaanchi was released on 25 April 2014.

Soundtrack

Director Subhash Ghai, who is known to work very closely and meticulously with the composers on his films, said that "I have recorded four songs by Ismail Darbar and Salim–Sulaiman on the lyrics of Irshad Kamil and I can say today that it's going to be big blockbuster music album on the day it will be released."

While Darbar, Kamil and Salim-Sulaiman worked together on the songs, the film score was composed by Simaab Sen.

Critical reception
Kaanchi received mixed to negative reviews from critics. Subhash Ghai's direction was criticised compared to his previous movies Kalicharan, Karma, Karz and Pardes. The lead actress Mishti was praised for her divine beauty but her acting skills received mixed reviews.

The lead actor Kartik Aaryan, who made his debut in Pyar Ka Punchnama, was praised for his tremendous screen presence and acting skills even though his part was small.

References

External links
 
 

2010s Hindi-language films
Indian action films
2014 films
Films directed by Subhash Ghai
Indian films about revenge
2014 action films